Cryptogemma aethiopica is a species of sea snail, a marine gastropod mollusk in the family Turridae, the turrids.

Description
The length of the shell attains 42.2 mm, its diameter 16.9 mm.

Distribution
This species occurs in the Indian Ocean off Somalia and Madagascar; also in the Central Indo-Pacific at depths between 400 m to 850 m: in the South China Sea; off Sumatra, Indonesia.

References

 Thiele J. (1925). Gastropoden der Deutschen Tiefsee-Expedition. II Teil. Wissenschaftliche Ergebnisse der Deutschen Tiefsee-Expedition auf dem Dampfer "Valdivia" 1898-1899. 17(2): 35-382, pls 13-46
 Powell, A.W.B. (1964) The family Turridae in the Indo-Pacific. Part 1. The subfamily Turrinae. Indo-Pacific Mollusca, 1(5), 227–346.
 MacNeil F. S. (1961 ["1960"]) Tertiary and Quaternary Gastropoda of Okinawa. United States Geological Survey Professional Paper 339: iv + 148 pp., 21 pls. 
 Martin, K. 1935. Oligocaene Gastropoden von Buton. Leidsche Geologische Mededeelingen 7(1):111-118, pl. 2.
 Cernohorsky, Walter O. "Taxonomic notes on some deep-water Turridae (Mollusca: Gastropoda) from the Malagasy Republic." Records of the Auckland Institute and Museum (1987): 123–134.
 Liu, J.Y. [Ruiyu] (ed.). (2008). Checklist of marine biota of China seas. China Science Press. 1267 pp.
 Li B. [Baoquan] & Li X. [Xinzheng]. (2008). Report on the turrid genera Gemmula, Lophiotoma and Ptychosyrinx (Gastropoda: Turridae: Turrinae) from the China seas. Zootaxa. 1778: 1-25.

External links
 Zaharias P., Kantor Y.I., Fedosov A.E., Criscione F., Hallan A., Kano Y., Bardin J. & Puillandre N. (2020). Just the once will not hurt: DNA suggests species lumping over two oceans in deep-sea snails (Cryptogemma). Zoological Journal of the Linnean Society. DOI: 10.1093/zoolinnean/zlaa010/5802562
 
 Finlay H.J. (1930). Invalid molluscan names. No. 1. Transactions of the New Zealand Institute. 61: 37-48

aethiopica
Gastropods described in 1964